South Roxana, incorporated in March 1967, is a village in Madison County, Illinois, United States. The population was 1,891 at the 2020 census.

Geography
South Roxana is bordered to the north and east by the village of Roxana, to the south by a western extension of the city of Edwardsville, and to the west by the village of Hartford.

Illinois Route 111 runs along the western edge of South Roxana, leading north  to Wood River and south  to Pontoon Beach. Illinois Route 255, a four-lane expressway, passes just east of the village limits, with access from Exits 3 and 5. Route 255 leads south  to Interstates 255 and 270 and north  to Bethalto.

Demographics

At the 2000 census there were 1,888 people, 707 households, and 518 families living in the village. The racial makeup of the village was 97.67% White, 0.32% African American, 0.42% Native American, 0.21% Asian, 0.11% Pacific Islander, 0.32% from other races, and 0.95% from two or more races. Hispanic or Latino of any race were 0.85%.

Of the 707 households 38.0% had children under the age of 18 living with them, 53.2% were married couples living together, 15.3% had a female householder with no husband present, and 26.6% were non-families. 20.1% of households were one person and 8.5% were one person aged 65 or older. The average household size was 2.67 and the average family size was 3.08.

The age distribution was 28.8% under the age of 18, 8.8% from 18 to 24, 30.6% from 25 to 44, 21.6% from 45 to 64, and 10.3% 65 or older. The median age was 34 years. For every 100 females, there were 96.3 males. For every 100 females age 18 and over, there were 94.5 males.

The median household income was $33,295 and the median family income  was $37,344. Males had a median income of $34,712 versus $21,552 for females. The per capita income for the village was $14,938. About 17.4% of families and 19.8% of the population were below the poverty line, including 30.3% of those under age 18 and 8.0% of those age 65 or over.

References

Villages in Madison County, Illinois
Villages in Illinois